Fátima Gálvez Marín (born 19 January 1987) is a Spanish sport shooter. She was the World champion in the individual trap event at the 2015 World Shotgun Championships, and won the Olympic champion in the team event at the 2020 Summer Olympics.

Gálvez won a silver medal in the women's trap at the first meet of the 2011 ISSF Shotgun World Cup series in Concepcion, Chile, with a score of 91 clay pigeons, earning her first Olympic participation.

Gálvez represented Spain at the 2012 Summer Olympics in London, where she competed in the women's trap. Gálvez barely advanced to the final, after scoring a total of 70 targets from the qualifying rounds, and winning a three-person shoot-off against Finland's Satu Mäkelä-Nummela and Russia's Elena Tkach, with a bonus of 12 points. She finished in fifth place, by twelve points behind winner and world-record holder Jessica Rossi of Italy, accumulating a score of 87 targets (17 in the final).

At the 2016 Summer Olympics in Rio de Janeiro, Gálvez advanced to the bronze medal match in the women's trap but lost to in the shoot-off to United States' Corey Cogdell. 

At the 2020 Summer Olympics in Tokyo, Gálvez did not advance to the final in the individual event, finishing 14th. In the mixed trap team, Gálvez won the gold medal together with Alberto Fernández by winning the shoot-off in the final against San Marino's Alessandra Perilli and Gian Marco Berti.

Notes

References

External links

1987 births
Living people
Spanish female sport shooters
Trap and double trap shooters
Olympic shooters of Spain
Shooters at the 2012 Summer Olympics
Shooters at the 2016 Summer Olympics
Shooters at the 2020 Summer Olympics
Sportspeople from Córdoba, Spain
Shooters at the 2015 European Games
Shooters at the 2019 European Games
European Games medalists in shooting
European Games gold medalists for Spain
European Games bronze medalists for Spain
Mediterranean Games silver medalists for Spain
Mediterranean Games medalists in shooting
Competitors at the 2013 Mediterranean Games
Competitors at the 2018 Mediterranean Games
Medalists at the 2020 Summer Olympics
Olympic medalists in shooting
Olympic gold medalists for Spain
21st-century Spanish women